Start-Ups: Silicon Valley is an American reality television series that aired on Bravo. The series debuted on November 5, 2012. Citing low viewership, Bravo chose not to renew the series for a second season.

Premise
The series followed six start up companies in the Silicon Valley.

Cast

 Ben Way
 David Murray
 Dwight Crow
 Hermione Way
 Kim Taylor
 Sarah Austin
 Marcus Lovingood
 Jay Holanda, model
 Michael Gale, investor

Episodes

References

External links
 

2010s American reality television series
2012 American television series debuts
2012 American television series endings
Television shows set in Santa Clara County, California
English-language television shows
Bravo (American TV network) original programming
Culture of Silicon Valley
Television in the San Francisco Bay Area